National Highway 753J, commonly referred to as NH 753J is a national highway in  India. It is a spur road of National Highway 53. NH-753J traverses the state of Maharashtra in India.

Route 

Jalgaon, Mehrun, Shiroli, Samner, Lasgaon, Pachora, Bhadgaon, Chalisgaon, Tambole, Hirapur, Nyaydongri, Pimperkhed, Nandgaon, Manmad.

Junctions  

  Terminal near Jalgaon.
  Terminal near Manmad.

See also 

 List of National Highways in India
 List of National Highways in India by state

References

External links 

 NH 753J on OpenStreetMap

National highways in India
National Highways in Maharashtra